Zsombó is a village in Csongrád county, in the Southern Great Plain region of southern Hungary.

Geography
More information: [www.zsombo.hu]

Populated places in Csongrád-Csanád County